Esther Rolick (1922–2008) was an American painter born in Rochester, New York, on October 9, 1922. She studied at the Art Students League and was represented by Jacques Seligmann Galleries in New York in the early 1950's. She was a fellow at Yaddo and the MacDowell Colony, and her exhibition credits range from the Whitney Museum of American Art to Le Centre D'Art in Haiti. Rolick traveled and painted extensively, especially in Bogota, Colombia,  Rome, and Tahiti. She is listed in Who Was Who in American Art, and her papers are in the Archives of American Art of the Smithsonian Institution.

She  was known for her style which was considered to be both expressionist and neo-romantic. In some of her works she painted with what one critic called "meticulous realism" but was better known for works incorporating fantastic elements. Her most prolific periods centered around dream-scapes of fantasy plants, flowers, and peaceful and friendly wildlife. She was one of the few female artists in the avante-gard movement of the late 1940s and 1950s. She taught college classes for many years and achieved recognition for taking innovative approaches.

Early life and training

Rolick attended public schools in Rochester, New York and graduated from the city's Washington High School in 1940. She took art classes while in school and also studied under the sculptor William Ehrich in Rochester's Memorial Art Gallery. In 1941, a local newspaper printed a photo of Rolick with a sculpted figure called "The Refugee", a piece that was to appear in a student exhibition in the gallery of Rochester's Rundel Memorial Library. She traveled to New York City in the early 1940s to study under the American expressionist artist, Harry Sternberg, and others at the Art Students League. In 1945 and 1946 and again in 1953, Yaddo, the philanthropically supported artists' community in Saratoga Springs, New York, accepted her applications for its weeks-long residencies. In 1948, she was able to travel and study in Europe for the first time, possibly with financial support from the actress Hildegarde Watson.  In 1947 and 1952, she received fellowship awards to work at the MacDowell Colony in Peterborough, New Hampshire. In 1954, she received a fellowship from the Huntington Hartford Foundation to work at an estate in Pacific Palisades, California.

Career in art

In 1943, Rolick participated in an annual competition held by the  A.C.A Gallery in New York to select an artist for a solo exhibition during the following year. When the gallery's jury was unable to select a winner, she and six other finalists were named to an honorable-mention group for a small-group show instead. In January 1947, she was given a solo exhibition of drawings at the Jacques Seligmann Galleries in New York and a few months later her paintings appeared in a group show at the Los Angeles County Museum of Art. When the Seligmann Galleries gave her a solo exhibition of paintings in January 1948, a critic for the New York Times noted in them a "directness and fervor" and said they showed considerable improvement on the works she had previously shown. When that exhibition closed in New York, Seligmann toured it around the country. When it appeared in Louisville, Kentucky, a critic for the Louisville Courier-Journal said Rolick had been remarkably successful for a 24-year-old artist, having made sales to collectors, including the art historian Wilhelm Valentiner. Later in 1948, Seligmann included Rolick's paintings in a group of six. At that time a Times critic called her paintings "technically sure and sophisticated".

During the 1950s and 1960s, she traveled abroad to places having warm climates with abundant sunshine, including Italy, Spain, North Africa, Haiti, and Colombia. Scenes from these locations subsequently frequently appeared in her work. in New York City she maintained a small studio and her inner circle was composed of avant-garde artists of the time including Jackson Pollack.

Rolick presented a solo exhibition of paintings, sculptures, and drawings in 1950 at the Rochester Historical Society. Later in the year, she received a settlement payment in a suit she had brought after a warehouse fire had destroyed many of her paintings. Four years later, Seligman mounted her third solo show. In it, Howard Devree of the New York Times saw higher-key, more decorative work than he had seen before along with some of the "sturdy, primarily expressionist paintings" he had previously noted.

During the remainder of the 1950s, Rolick had solo exhibitions in both commercial and nonprofit galleries, including the Rochester Historical Society (paintings and drawings, 1956), the Harry Salpeter Gallery in New York (recent paintings, 1956), the F.A.R. Gallery in New York (drawings, 1959), and the art gallery at Hofstra University (oils, watercolors, and drawings, 1959). There were few solo or group exhibitions of her work during the rest of her life. In the early 1990s, Rolick moved from Manhattan back to Rochester. She died in a nursing home in Rochester in 2008.

Artistic style

Rolick made sculptures and drawings early in her career but received most notice for her oils. She was known for realist paintings and fantastic treatment of natural subjects. One critic saw a Van Gogh-like immediacy and emotional content in them. Another saw this directness as freedom from "extraneous thoughts". Her work was labeled expressionist and neo-romantic. Mid-career, she showed watercolors along with oils and drawings. Critics' reactions were much the same as before. One said she had a flair for dramatic presentation and expressionist emotional projection. Others noted her bold use of colors and stylized treatment of natural subjects"fantasy paintings" that were "based on keen observation". At the end of her career, her work drew little comment. In that period, she added collages and constructions to the paintings and drawings for which she continued to be best known.

An untitled painting of animals and human figured from 1941, shown at right, shows her handling of color and treatment of fantastic subjects in oil. A drawing from 1942, "Self-Portrait in Shoe", shown at left, indicates a light-hearted use of fantasy early in her career. An oil of 1948-1949 called "Nuns and Priest Pass by Ruins, Florence", shown at right, indicates her mid-career handling of color and fantasy in an urban setting. At left, another oil, "Night Is a Black Cat", of 1951, shows her ability to paint in a decorative style while still maintaining what a critic called "sinister" overtones.

Art teacher

In the mid-1960s, Rolick began to teach at Mercy College. The school was founded in 1950 by the Sisters of Mercy religious order. Originally located in Tarrytown, New York as a school for women called Mercy Junior College, it moved to nearby Dobbs Ferry in 1961 and, now known as Mercy College, became a four-year school. In 1968 it received accreditation and subsequently became independent, nonsectarian, and coeducational. Having joined the faculty at about the time the school expanded its curriculum and moved to Dobbs Ferry, she was an assistant professor of fine arts by 1970. By 1979, her course load included drawing, multi-media, and art appreciation. During the roughly two decades that she taught there, she helped develop several innovative programs including a class on "Black Music and Art" of 1970–71 in which she interviewed prominent members of the Harlem music and art communities. Mercy College had a reputation of innovative programming, including evening and weekend classes. As one component of this innovation, Rolick joined with a member of the music department in 1979 to teach classes that began at 1:30 in the morning.

Personal life and family

Rolick was born on October 9, 1922, in Rochester, New York. Her father was Ellis Rolick (born 1892 in Ivenets, White Russia, currently Belarus, died 1951 in Rochester). The family name was  originally "Rolnik" and there are several branches of the family still bearing that name both in the United  States and Israel. He ran a local shoe store and was well known for selling boots and shoes to farmers out of a hand-pushed barrow at the Rochester Public Market. Rolick's mother was Rose (Lifschitz) Rolick (born 1898 in Polish Russia, died 1960 in Rochester) who helped her husband run the shoe business while also raising a large family. The two were married in 1919 in Rochester shortly after his first wife had died. Rolick was their youngest child. She had four step-brothers and sisters from her father's first marriage. They were Sophia Rolick (1912-2008), Idaire Rolick (1912-1993), Suzanne Rolick (1913-1993), Emanuel Rolick (1916-1987). She also had a brother and sister from his second marriage: Dorothy Rolick (1918-2005) and Samuel Rolick (1920-2006).

There is little information about Rolick's personal life. Reliable sources do not contain evidence of marriage, close friendships, or most other personal affairs. She had one child given up for adoption in the late 1940s. Regarding health issues, in 1946, the writer Leo Lerman, who was at Yaddo during Rolick's first time there, wrote that she suffered from depression (he said it was "manic depressiveness"). Saying that Rolick was generally cheerful, he described an occasion when she came to breakfast "with her face black—horribly awful and corrupt with darkness" and added, "You could see misery eating at her". He said another Yaddo resident told him Rolick could be heard weeping and sobbing during the night.

Rolick lived in Manhattan during most of her career. She returned to Rochester in the early 1990s and, in the early years of the next decade, moved to the Jewish Home of Rochester, a long-term care facility. She died there on September 29, 2008.

Notes

References

1922 births
2008 deaths
Artists from Rochester, New York
American people of Belarusian-Jewish descent
American women painters
American women sculptors
Jewish American artists
Jewish painters
Jewish sculptors
Yaddo alumni
20th-century American artists
20th-century American women artists
21st-century American women